Masham is a town in North Yorkshire, England.

Masham may also refer to

Masham, Yemen, a village in west central Yemen
Masham (sheep)
Baron Masham, a title in the British peerage
Damaris Cudworth Masham (1659-1708), English theologian
Various villages in La Pêche, Quebec, Canada.